Avantika Mishra is an Indian actress and former model who predominantly appears in Telugu films. She has also acted in Tamil films.

Early life and background 
A native of New Delhi, She studied in the Air Force Golden Jubilee Institute and K V Hebbal, Bangalore. Later, she traveled a lot for modeling assignments, which gave her the confidence to enter the film industry. After being in modeling for six months, she got a chance to meet director Neelakanta and it took just 10 minutes to finalize her for the role.

Career 
 
Mishra began her career as a model for Puma, Femina, and several other brands. Her first acting role was in Neelakanta's Maaya. She played the lead in Meeku Meere Maaku Meme alongside Tarun Shetty; the film was released on 17 June 2016. 
 
She appeared alongside Tharun Bhascker Dhaassyam and Vani Bhojan in the film Meeku Maathrame Cheptha produced by Vijay Deverakonda. She will be next seen as a lead in D Block, a college-based drama alongside actor Arulnithi and directed by YouTuber Vijay Kumar Rajendran (of Eruma Saani fame). She is also playing the lead in Enna Solla Pogirai, a film to be directed by debutante Hariharan for Trident Arts production co-starring Ashwin Kumar Lakshmikanthan.

Filmography

References

Living people
Indian film actresses
Female models from Bangalore
Place of birth missing (living people)
Actresses in Telugu cinema
Actresses in Tamil cinema
21st-century Indian actresses
Actresses from Bangalore
Year of birth missing (living people)